Yamakawa (characters for "mountain" and "river") may refer to:

Yamakawa, Tokushima, town in Oe District, Tokushima
Yamakawa, Fukuoka, town in Yamato District, Fukuoka
8923 Yamakawa, asteroid

People with the surname
, Japanese female talent
, Japanese educator
, samurai, politician and educator
, Japanese socialist
, Japanese professional baseball player
, the author of Kuso Miso Technique
, Japanese producer of Romance of Darkness
, Japanese author and rock musician
, Japanese physicist, university president, and author
, Japanese socialist and feminist
Maki Yamakawa, Japanese fashion model and radio personality, director of Kekko Kamen
, Japanese actress
, Japanese Enka singer

Japanese-language surnames